The 17th White Elephant Awards, given by the Russian Guild of Film Critics (RGOFC), honored the best in Russian film for 2014.

Winners and nominees

References

External links
  (in Russian)

2014 film awards